This is a complete list of members of the United States Senate during the 95th United States Congress listed by seniority, from January 3, 1977, to January 3, 1979.

Order of service is based on the commencement of the senator's first term. Behind this is former service as a senator (only giving the senator seniority within his or her new incoming class), service as vice president, a House member, a cabinet secretary, or a governor of a state. The final factor is the population of the senator's state.

In this congress, John C. Stennis was the most senior junior senator until James Eastland resigned on December 27, 1978, after which it was Henry M. Jackson. Four senators held the distinction of most junior senior senator during this Congress: John Glenn (D-Ohio) from the start of the congress until John L. McClellan's death on November 28, 1977, Dale Bumpers from then until Lee Metcalf's death on January 12, 1978, John Melcher from then until Wendell Anderson's resignation on December 29, 1978, and finally David Durenberger through the end of the Congress.

Senators who were sworn in during the middle of the two-year congressional term (up until the last senator who was not sworn in early after winning the November 1978 election) are listed at the end of the list with no number.

Terms of service

U.S. Senate seniority list

See also
95th United States Congress
List of members of the United States House of Representatives in the 95th Congress by seniority

References

External links
Senate Seniority List

095